is a town located in Nagano Prefecture, Japan. , the town had an estimated population of 18,951 in 7917 households, and a population density of 112 persons per km2.

Geography
Tatsuno is located in the Ina Valley of south-central Nagano Prefecture, bordered by the Kiso Mountains. The Tenryū River flows through the town, which is surrounded by mountains and is rich in a natural environment.  It is takes about 3 hours from Tokyo, 2 hours from Nagoya, 5 hours from Kyoto by train and equally by car. Part of the town is within the borders of the Enrei Ōjō Prefectural Natural Park. The Yokokawa Dam is located in Tatsuno.

Surrounding municipalities
Nagano Prefecture
 Okaya
 Suwa
Shiojiri
 Minamiminowa
 Minowa

Climate
The village has a climate characterized by characterized by warm and humid summers, and cold winters (Köppen climate classification Dfa).

History
The area of present-day Tatsuno was part of ancient Shinano Province. The village of Inatomi established on April 1, 1889, by the establishment of the municipalities system, and was elevated to town status on January 1, 1947, changing its name to Tatsuno at that time. The neighboring  village of Asahi was annexed on April 1, 1955, followed by Kawashima on September 30, 1956, and Ono on March 31, 1961.

Demographics
Per Japanese census data, the population of Tatsuno has declined slightly in recent decades.

Education
Tatsuno has five public elementary schools and five public middle school operated by the town government, and one high school operated the Nagano Prefectural Board of Education. The Shinshu Honan Junior College is also located in Tatsuno.

Transportation

Railway
 East Japan Railway Company -  Chūō Main Line (old line)
 -  - 
 Central Japan Railway Company - Iida Line
 -  -  -

Highway
  Chūō Expressway

International relations
 - Waitomo, New Zealand.

Local attractions
 : one of the most famous places in Japan for fireflies (called  in Japan) every summer. However, the intentional introduction of non-native fireflies and its negative influence on the native fireflies of Tatsuno were highlighted in an academic journal. and several major newspapers.
Enrei Ōjō Prefectural Natural Park

References

External links

Official Website 

 
Towns in Nagano Prefecture